Lieven De Lathauwer from the KU Leuven, Belgium was named Fellow of the Institute of Electrical and Electronics Engineers (IEEE) in 2015 for contributions to signal processing algorithms using tensor decompositions. He was elected as a fellow of the Society for Industrial and Applied Mathematics in 2017, "for fundamental contributions to theory, computation, and application of tensor decompositions". He received a PhD in engineering from KU Leuven in 1997.

References 

Fellow Members of the IEEE
Fellows of the Society for Industrial and Applied Mathematics
Living people
Year of birth missing (living people)